The 1973 Holton Tennis Classic, also known as the St. Louis WCT, was a men's professional tennis tournament that was part of Group A of the 1973 World Championship Tennis circuit. It was held on indoor carpet courts at the Kiel Auditorium in St. Louis, Missouri in the United States. It was the third edition of the tournament and was held from March 26 through April 1, 1973. Second-seeded Stan Smith won the singles title and earned $10,000 first-prize money.

Finals

Singles

 Stan Smith defeated  Rod Laver 6–4, 3–6, 6–4
 It was Smith' 3rd singles title of the year and the 38th of his career in the Open Era.

Doubles
 Ove Nils Bengtson /  Jim McManus defeated  Terry Addison /  Colin Dibley 6–2, 7–5

References

External links
 ITF tournament edition details

Tennis in Missouri
1973 in American tennis